Gordon Randolph (October 3, 1915 – November 6, 1999) was a journalist for the Milwaukee Journal Sentinel from 1938 to 1980. Born in Waterloo, Iowa, he grew up in Milwaukee, Wisconsin and graduated from the University of Wisconsin–Madison. He wrote many articles about his family. For example, in one news clip he wrote about how, in the 1950s, he took his family on a trip out west and only spent $500.

References

External links 
 https://news.google.com/newspapers?nid=1683&dat=19991108&id=CvEcAAAAIBAJ&sjid=aS8EAAAAIBAJ&pg=6563,7940735
 http://www.fundinguniverse.com/company-histories/Koss-Corporation-Company-History.html
 http://boards.ancestry.com/localities.northam.usa.states.wisconsin.counties.milwaukee/2422/mb.ashx

1915 births
1999 deaths
American male journalists
20th-century American journalists
Writers from Waterloo, Iowa
Writers from Milwaukee
University of Wisconsin–Madison alumni
20th-century American non-fiction writers
20th-century American male writers